James Richardson (1885 – August 1951) was a professional footballer and manager, who played for Third Lanark, Huddersfield Town, Sunderland, Ayr United and Millwall.

Richardson joined Sunderland in 1912 and played there for two years, scoring a total of 31 goals over 45 appearances. In his first season with Sunderland he helped them win the league for the first time since the 1894–95 season and the last time until the 1935–36 season. He also played in the 1913 FA Cup Final against Aston Villa, with Sunderland losing 1–0.

In the 1914–15 season, while playing for Ayr United, Richardson was joint top goalscorer in the Scottish league, with a total of 29 goals. In 1916, Richardson went to fight in France during the Great War. He returned in 1918 with stomach troubles, but was well enough to join the first team again on 2 November 1918, scoring a hat-trick against Hibernian in a match that ended 5–0.

After retiring as a player Richardson became a manager for several clubs including Ayr United and Cowdenbeath. To this day, the 1924–25 season that Cowdenbeath played with Richardson as manager is still considered their greatest ever performance. For reasons unknown, despite having an incredible season, Richardson left the club after just one year as manager.

After retiring from management, Richardson remained a fan of Ayr United and was spotted at the club as a supporter just a few months prior to his death in August 1951. He remains Ayr United's third highest goalscorer, despite having missed two seasons due to active service. On 4 January 1921, Ayr United held a testimonial match at Somerset Park for Richardson, known amongst fans as "Jimmy's Day".

References

 

1885 births
1951 deaths
Association football forwards
Huddersfield Town A.F.C. players
Sunderland A.F.C. players
Ayr United F.C. players
Scottish Football League players
Scottish Junior Football Association players
Scottish Football League representative players
Scottish footballers
English Football League players
Scotland wartime international footballers
Ayr United F.C. managers
Cowdenbeath F.C. managers
Scottish football managers
Scottish league football top scorers
British Army personnel of World War I
People from Bridgeton, Glasgow
Footballers from Glasgow
Kirkintilloch Rob Roy F.C. players
Third Lanark A.C. players
Ashfield United F.C. players
Millwall F.C. players
Mid-Annandale F.C. players
British military personnel of World War I
Scottish Football League managers
FA Cup Final players